The Monument Square–Eagle Street Historic District is a historic district encompassing the civic heart of North Adams, Massachusetts.  When it was originally designated in 1972, the district encompassed Monument Square – west of the intersection of Main Street and Church Street, and the location of a Civil War memorial – and the area around it.  This designation included the North Adams Public Library (formerly the Blackinton Mansion), the First Baptist Church and First Congregational Church, and a block of shops Eagle Street.  In 1988, the district's boundaries were increased to be roughly bounded by Holden, Center and Union Streets, the East Middle School (now the Silvio O. Conte Middle School), Summer Street, and Main Street.  This expansion extended the district westward along Summer Street to include the US Post Office building and St. John's Church, and eastward to include Colgrove Park, the middle school, and St. Francis Catholic Church.  An additional block of commercial buildings was also added on the north side of West Main Street, extending just west of Holden Street.

North Adams was settled as part of Adams in the mid-18th century, and soon developed as an industrial village, powered by the waters of the two branches of the Hoosic River, which meet just northwest of its central business district.  The waterfront areas were developed with mills producing a variety of goods, which were eventually dominated by textiles beginning in the mid-19th century.  The central business district around Monument Square, were the town's Baptist Church was founded in 1808, led by Otis Blackinton, whose family would dominate the local industrial business landscape.  Most of the city's business district was developed between about 1870 and 1920, the greatest period of its economic success.  A major decline was begun by the Great Depression, resulting in little growth in subsequent decades.

See also
 National Register of Historic Places listings in Berkshire County, Massachusetts

References
Notes

External links

North Adams, Massachusetts
Historic districts in Berkshire County, Massachusetts
National Register of Historic Places in Berkshire County, Massachusetts
Historic districts on the National Register of Historic Places in Massachusetts